Ryōki, Ryoki or Ryouki (written:  or ) is a masculine Japanese given name. Notable people with the name include:

Ryoki Inoue (born 1946), Brazilian writer
, Japanese animator
, Japanese politician

Japanese masculine given names